114 may refer to:

114 (number)
AD 114
114 BC
114 (1st London) Army Engineer Regiment, Royal Engineers, an English military unit
114 (Antrim Artillery) Field Squadron, Royal Engineers, a Northern Irish military unit
114 (MBTA bus)
114 (New Jersey bus)

See also
11/4 (disambiguation)
Flerovium, synthetic chemical element with atomic number 114